The Voice of Poland (season 2) began airing 2 March 2013 on TVP 2.

For this season, during the battle round, opposing coaches have the ability to steal the singer that was sent home by the original coach. If more than one coach hits their buzzer to recruit the singer in question, it's up to the contestant to decide which coach he or she wants to work with.

Coaches and Hosts

It was announced that Hubert Urbański and Magdalena Mielcarz will not be back to present the series. Tomasz Kammel and Marika, polish reggae singer, will present the show instead. Maciej Musiał will replace Mateusz Szymkowiak as a V Reporter. The new season will feature a new judging panel. The new judges are Justyna Steczkowska, Patrycja Markowska, Marek Piekarczyk and Tomson & Baron from Afromental. On April 6, 2013, it was reported, that Iga Krefft will join Musiał as a V Reporter.

Teams
Color key

Blind Auditions
The Blind Auditions took place from 8 to 11 February 2013.

Color keys

Episode 1 (March 2, 2013)

Episode 2 (March 2, 2013)

Episode 3 (March 9, 2013)

Episode 4 (March 9, 2013)

Episode 5 (March 16, 2013)

Episode 6 (March 16, 2013)

Episode 7 (March 23, 2013)

Episode 8 (March 23, 2013)

Episode 9 (March 30, 2013)

Episode 10 (March 30, 2013)

The Battle Rounds

The Battle Rounds took place on 9 and 10 March. 'Steals' were introduced this season, where each coach can steal one contestant from another team when he/she lost his/her battle round.

Color keys

The Knockouts
After the Battle Round, each coach had 7 contestants for the Knockouts. Each had to choose 3 contestants who advanced to the live shows automatically. The remaining 4 contestants had to participate in the knockout battles. The contestants were not told who they were up against until the day of the Knockout. Each contestant sang a song of their own choice, back to back, and each knockout concluded with the respective coach eliminating one of the two contestants; the two winners for each coach advanced to the live shows.

Episode 14 (April 20, 2013)
Color keys

Live Shows

Color keys

Episode 15 (April 27, 2013)

Quarterfinal (May 4, 2013)

Semifinal (May 11, 2013)

Final (May 18, 2013)

Results summary of live shows
Color keys
Artist's info

Result details

References

The Voice of Poland
2013 Polish television seasons